Bobrynets is a city in Kropyvnytskyi Raion, Kirovohrad Oblast (province) of Ukraine. It hosts the administration of Bobrynets urban hromada, one of the hromadas of Ukraine. Population:

History
Settlement in the Yelisavetgradsky Uyezd of the Kherson Governorate of the Russian Empire.

At the beginning of the 20th century, the Jewish population of the town was 3,500 inhabitants. During the Russian civil war (1918–1920), 160 Jews were killed during pogroms. Many left the city before the Germans occupied the area. In 1941, Jews were kept prisoners in a ghetto. At the beginning of 1942, 358 Jews were murdered in mass executions perpetrated in the nearby forest.

In 1968 population was 11 600 people.

In 1989 population was 12 869 people.

In 2013 population was 10 991 people.

Until 18 July 2020, Bobrynets was the administrative center of Bobrynets Raion. The raion was abolished in July 2020 as part of the administrative reform of Ukraine, which reduced the number of raions of Kirovohrad Oblast to four. The area of Bobrynets Raion was merged into Kropyvnytskyi Raion.

Climate

Gallery

References

Cities in Kirovohrad Oblast
Cities of district significance in Ukraine
Yelisavetgradsky Uyezd
Holocaust locations in Ukraine